Jeremy Michael Parquet (born April 11, 1982) is a former professional gridiron football player. He was drafted by the Kansas City Chiefs in the seventh round of the 2005 NFL Draft. He played college football at Southern Mississippi.

Parquet has been a member of the Kansas City Chiefs, St. Louis Rams, Pittsburgh Steelers, Las Vegas Locomotives and the Edmonton Eskimos. He earned a Super Bowl ring with the Steelers in Super Bowl XLIII over the Arizona Cardinals.

High school career
Parquet was a two time All State and All District offensive tackle in high school at Destrehan High School.

College career
Parquet played college football at Southern Mississippi where he played in 44 games starting 39 of them. Starting at offensive guard as a Freshman and Sophomore and at offensive tackle as a Junior and Senior. He graduated with a degree in Coaching and Sports Administration in December 2003.

Professional career

Kansas City Chiefs
Parquet was selected by the Kansas City Chiefs in the seventh round (238th overall) in the 2005 NFL Draft.

St. Louis Rams
Parquet spent the last five weeks of the 2006 season on the active roster.

He spent 2007 off and on  the practice squad and active roster.

Pittsburgh Steelers
On January 2, 2008, he was added to the Steelers active roster.

Parquet spent the first six weeks of the 2008 regular season on the Steelers' practice squad. He was promoted to the active roster on October 18 after the team waived defensive tackle Scott Paxson.

Parquet was waived by the Steelers during final cuts on September 5, 2009.

Las Vegas Locomotives
Parquet was signed by the Las Vegas Locomotives of the United Football League on September 26, 2009.

Edmonton Eskimos
Parquet signed with the Edmonton Eskimos on April 20, 2010.

Post Football

Parquet retired from professional football in July 2011 due to complications from head injuries suffered throughout his career.

References

External links
Pittsburgh Steelers bio
Just Sports Stats

1982 births
Living people
People from Norco, Louisiana
American football offensive tackles
Canadian football offensive linemen
Edmonton Elks players
Hamburg Sea Devils players
Kansas City Chiefs players
Las Vegas Locomotives players
Pittsburgh Steelers players
Players of American football from New Orleans
Players of Canadian football from New Orleans
St. Louis Rams players
Southern Miss Golden Eagles football players
Destrehan High School alumni